Lucroy is a French surname. Notable people with the surname include:

 Janet Lucroy (born 1970), American visual artist
 Jonathan Lucroy (born 1986), American baseball player

See also
 Luc Roy, Canadian actor

French-language surnames